National Highway 77 (NH 77) is a National Highway in India. This is the main National Highway to connect Pondicherry with Krishnagiri. It starts from Tindivanam in Villupuram district then runs westward till Uthangarai via Thiruvannamalai and then joins NH 48 at Krishnagiri. NH-77 runs entirely in the state of Tamil Nadu.

Route 
NH48 near Krishnagiri, Uthangarai, Tiruvannamalai, Gingee, NH32 near Tindivanam

Junctions  
 
  Terminal near Krishnagiri.
  near Uthangarai
  near Tiruvannamalai
  Terminal near Tindivanam.

See also 
 List of National Highways in India (by Highway Number)
 List of National Highways in India
 National Highways Development Project

References

External links 
 NH 77 on OpenStreetMap

National highways in India
77